Dennis Paul Kinney (born February 26, 1952) is a former Major League Baseball pitcher. He played all or parts of five seasons in the majors, from  until .

Kinney was selected by the Cleveland Indians in the 10th round of the 1970 Major League Baseball Draft, and he played in their organization through his major league debut in 1978. He was given a chance at closing games for the Indians, notching five saves in 18 games. That June, however, he was traded to the San Diego Padres for pitcher Dan Spillner.

That year, he pitched in 50 games as a reliever, compiling a 4–6 record with a 4.25 ERA and one save. In December, he was traded to the Detroit Tigers for outfielder Dave Stegman, but appeared in just six games for the Tigers before being released in the offseason.

On August 21, 1980, with the Padres trailing the host Philadelphia Phillies, 7–6, Kinney came in to pitch the bottom of the 8th inning surrendering a single and a run-scoring double to the first two batters he faced. The Padres rallied with 2 runs of their own in the top of the 9th inning to tie the score, 8–8. The relief appearance lasted 9 innings as Bake McBride's triple plated a run in the bottom of the 17th inning for the Phillies' 9–8 victory.

References

External links

Major League Baseball pitchers
Cleveland Indians players
San Diego Padres players
Detroit Tigers players
Oakland Athletics players
Gulf Coast Indians players
Reno Silver Sox players
San Antonio Brewers players
San Jose Bees players
Williamsport Tomahawks players
Toledo Mud Hens players
Jersey City Indians players
Hawaii Islanders players
Evansville Triplets players
Tacoma Tigers players
Baseball players from Ohio
1952 births
Living people